Thomas Matthew Biss (born 20 January 1993) is a New Zealand footballer who plays as an attacking midfielder for Brunswick City SC

Biography
In June 2012, Biss was named as one of eight inaugural players to join the Wellington Phoenix academy dubbed the 'Football School of Excellence'. Owing to seven Phoenix players being away on international duty Biss and fellow FSE player Luke Rowe were called on to make their debuts in a Round 2 away fixture versus Melbourne Heart. Despite four players making their debut the Phoenix managed come away with a 1–1 draw, Biss played 87 minutes in midfield.

References 

Living people
1993 births
New Zealand association footballers
Association football midfielders
A-League Men players
Wellington Phoenix FC players
Team Wellington players
Hawke's Bay United FC players
New Zealand under-20 international footballers